Demetrida constricticeps is a species of ground beetle in Lebiinae subfamily. It was described by Sloane in 1898 and is endemic to Australia.

References

Beetles described in 1898
Beetles of Australia
constricticeps